Solventogenesis is the biochemical production of solvents (usually acetone and butanol) by Clostridium species. It is the second phase of ABE fermentation.

Process 
Solventogenic Clostridium species have a biphasic metabolism composed of an acidogenic phase and a solventogenic phase.  During acidogenesis, these bacteria are able to convert several carbon sources into organic acids, commonly butyrate and acetate.  As acid accumulates, cells begin to assimilate the organic acids to solvents. In Clostridium acetobutylicum, a model solventogenic Clostridium species, a combination of low pH and high undisociated butyrate, referred to as the "pH-acid effect", triggers the metabolic shift from acidogenesis to solventogenesis.

Products 
Acetone, butanol, and ethanol are the most common products of solventogenesis.  Some species such as Clostridium beijerinckii, Clostridium puniceum and Clostridium roseum are able to further reduce acetone to isopropanol.  Several species are able to produce additional solvents under various culture conditions.  For example, glycerol fermentation results in the production of 1,3-propanediol in several species. Acetoin is produced by several species and is further reduced to 2,3-butanediol by Clostridium beijerinckii.

List of Solventogenic Clostridium

References 

Solvents
Biochemistry
Clostridia
Clostridium
Fermentation